Thirthkunde is a village in Belgaum district of Karnataka, India.

The original temple was built by Pandavas. However renovation was completed in 2019 with beautiful infrastructure built by a south Indian architect. Many devotees visit especially in the month of Shravan mas as per Hindhu panchang.

References

Villages in Belagavi district